William John (Jack) Read (born 18 September 1905, Hobart, Tasmania, Australia; died 29 June 1992, Ballarat, Victoria (Australia), was an Australian Coastwatcher on Bougainville Island in New Guinea during World War II. He was awarded the Distinguished Service Cross by the United States for his service during World War II in the Solomon Islands campaign and the New Guinea campaign. His experiences and reports have become an important source for historians regarding the history of the coastwatchers.

Early life
Read was born on 18 September 1905 in Hobart to William George Read and Eleanor Elfridine, (née Absolom). He attended Hobart State High School and after worked as a bookkeeper. In 1929, he married Gwenneth Ballantyne in 1929 before leaving for public service in the Mandated Territory of New Guinea. He and Gwen had one child together, Judith. Read served his cadetship in New Britain; in 1932 he was promoted to patrol officer and stationed in Madang. In 1936 he was promoted to assistant district officer and continued to serve in Madang, as well as Wau and Lae in the Morobe Province.

World War II
Madang Province and its capital was first colonized by Germany in the late 19th century and German colonial rule lasted until the end of World War I. When World War II began in Europe, Australia began interning foreign nationals suspected of Axis sympathies. Read was involved in taking German and Italian miners into custody in preparation for their deportation and internment in Australia. He applied for release from colonial service to enter the military, but this was denied and he assigned to the Buka Passage sub-district and sent to Bougainville Island where his duties included coastwatching.

Read had risen to the rank of sergeant in the Australian New Guinea Administrative Unit; he was initially inclined to join the Second Australian Imperial Force in 1942 but was convinced by Eric Feldt, the naval intelligence officer in charge of the Coastwatcher service in New Guinea and the Solomons to remain in his post. Feldt had also been a district officer at Madang, and knew Read well from their mutual service. Shortly after this he was appointed as a lieutenant in the Royal Australian Naval Volunteer Reserve. In this position he created a coastwatching network in Bougainville to gather intelligence on Japanese movements. Due to his ideal position along the coast, his intelligence was to be especially valuable to the Allies during the initial phase of the Solomon Islands campaign. Ian W. Toll writes in The Conquering Tide: War in the Pacific Islands, 1942-1944:

For the second consecutive day, a coastwatcher had provided vital forewarning of an incoming airstrike. It was a pattern that would continue throughout the Solomons campaign. Every day, or nearly so, the Japanese sent airstrikes down from Rabaul—and every day, Jack Read or Paul Mason spotted the southbound formations overhead and relayed the warning. Read was especially well situated for this purpose because his vantage point at Porapora commanded a panoramic view of all of Buka Island to the north, the eastern sea channels leading down the “Slot” (the body of water between the double file of islands that formed the Solomons archipelago), and the skies through which Japanese aircraft must pass.

This vital information denied the Japanese the advantage of a surprise attack and gave the Allies time to prepare for the incoming Japanese airstrike, by defensively dispersing their ships, manning anti-aircraft stations, and having their fighters in the air and ready to defend the fleet and the landings against the attack.

The Japanese were aware of the intelligence-gathering activities of the coastwatches and it became a top priority to find and capture them; as spies, they would have been quickly executed if they weren't killed during their capture for their activities. Read was nearly killed on one occasion and had to change locations often. He was constantly assisted by local villagers who both helped him evade capture, assisted with his intelligence-gathering activities, and provided him with priceless knowledge of the local environment. Eventually with the Japanese closing in on him, he was evacuated by the United States in July 1943 on the submarine USS Guardfish, which also rescued other coastwatchers and Australian civilians.

One of Read's final acts before being evacuated was to coordinate and assist with the evacuation of the civilians who had assisted him. On July 24, the day he was supposed to have been evacuated he discovered that no plans had been made to evacuate the indigenous police and civilians who had served with him. Having risked their lives for him, Read stated "There was no way I was going to leave without them." The Guardfish returned on July 30 and Read, along with the indigenous peoples who had assisted him, were evacuated.

On October 7, 1942, Read was awarded the Distinguished Service Cross by the United States for "extraordinary heroism" in service to the United States for his intelligence gathering during the Solomon Islands landing. Admiral William F. Halsey, the United States Navy commander for the South Pacific, stated that the intelligence gathered by Read on Bougainville had "saved Guadalcanal and that Guadalcanal had saved the South Pacific" Read was never honored by Australia or Britain for his service, a slight he attributed to prejudice against irregulars by the Australian Navy.

Read was commissioned as a Major by the Australian Imperial Forces in September 1944 and served in the Australian New Guinea Administrative Unit as acting district officer on Bougainville.

Post World War II
After the war, Read joined the administration of the Territory of Papua and New Guinea in the position of assistant district officer. He was stationed in Kavieng, New Ireland. He remained in this position until May 3, 1951, to take up a civilian appointment in Melbourne with the Department of the Navy. However, he was unsatisfied with life away from Papua New Guinea and returned in 1952 to take up a position as Native (indigenous) Land Commissioner. In this position, he researched local indigenous histories and determined the land rights of individuals or communities based on hereditary or customary rights. He retired from this position in 1975 and left for Australia when Papua New Guinea gained independence. He retained his commission with the Australian Naval Reserve, was promoted to lieutenant commander in 1950 and eventually retired from naval service in 1963.

In Australia, he would live in Melbourne with his wife pursuing his interest in photography. After over 50 years of marriage, his wife Gwen passed away in 1980 and he moved to Ballarat to be close to his only child Judith. After an extended illness, he died of lung disease on 29 June 1992 at Ballarat and was cremated.

Further reading
Books
 Feldt, E. (1946). The Coast Watchers. Melbourne: Oxford University Press.
 Feuer, A. B. (1992). Coastwatching in World War II. Stackpole Military History Series. Westport, CT: Stackpole Books.
 James, P. D. (2016). War at the End of the World: Douglas MacArthur and the Forgotten Fight For New Guinea, 1942-1945. New York: Penguin Books.
 Leckie, R. (1965). Challenge for the Pacific: Guadalcanal: The Turning Point of the War. London: Penguin Random House/Bantam Press.
 Lindsay, P. (2010). The Coast Watchers: The Men Behind Enemy Lines Who Saved the Pacific. North Sydney: Random House Australia.
 Lord, W. (2006). Lonely Vigil: Coastwatchers of the Solomons. Annapolis, MD: Naval Institute Press.
 McGee, W. L. (2001). The Solomons Campaigns, 1942-1943: From Guadalcanal to Bougainville, Pacific War Turning Point (S. E. Morrison, Ed. (Part1)). Napa, CA: BMC Publications. 
 Nelson, H. (2015). Bougainville In World War II. In Bougainville Before the Conflict (Regan A. & Griffin H. Eds.). Canberra: Australian National University Press. 
 Perrin, A. E. (1990). The Private War of the Spotters: A History of the New Guinea Air Warning Wireless Company February 1942 – April 1945. Foster, Victoria: NGAWW Publication Committee
 Prados, J. (2012). Islands of Destiny: The Solomons Campaign and the Eclipse of the Rising Sun. New York: New American Library.
 Toll, I. W. (2016). Chapters 24. In The Conquering Tide: War in the Pacific Islands, 1942-1944. New York: W. W. Norton & Company.

Journal Articles
 Bennett, J. (2004). Fears and Aspirations: US Military Intelligence Operations in the South Pacific, 1941-1945. The Journal of Pacific History, 39(3), pp. 283–307. 
 Blaxland, J. (2005). The Role of Signals Intelligence in Australian Military Operations. Australian Army Journal, 2(2), pp. 203–216.

Primary Sources
 National Archives of Australia: A452, 1959/6070
 National Archives of Australia. A518, F852/6/1B
 National Archives of Australia. A6769, Read WJ
 National Archives of Australia. B3476, 68
 National Archives of Australia. B3476, 77
 National Archives of Australia. B883, VX95356
 Pacific Manuscripts Bureau. PMB 1309, Read, Jack. New Guinea Patrol Reports, Related Documents and Photographs, 1930–1940
 Read, J. (2006). Coast Watcher: The Bougainville Reports 1941–1943 (A. B. Feuer, Ed.). Port Moresby: Papua New Guinea Printing Co.
 State Library of Victoria. MS 14503, Jack Read collection, 1942–2009
 The National Museum of the Pacific War: Jack Read oral history interview: Coastwatcher of World War II (Audio).

See also
 Axis naval activity in Australian waters
 Fleet Radio Unit
 Fleet Radio Unit, Melbourne
 Military history of Australia during World War II
 New Guinea Air Warning Wireless
 South West Pacific theatre of World War II
Individual Coastwatchers
 Martin Clemens
 Paul Mason (politician)
Arthur Reginald Evans
 Jacob C. Vouza

Notes

References

External links
Videos
 The Coastwatchers, Part 1. Australian Naval History, Season 4, Episode 5. Created and published by UNSW Canberra at the Australian Defence Force Academy.
 The Coastwatchers, Part 1. Australian Naval History, Season 4, Episode 6.
 "The Coast Watchers" - Guadalcanal 1942 (Part 1 of 2)
 "The Coast Watchers" - Guadalcanal 1942 (Part 2 of 2)
Articles
 Coast Watchers in the Solomons. John Brown, Warfare History Network.

People from Melbourne
Australian expatriates in Papua New Guinea
Australian military personnel of World War II
Recipients of the Distinguished Service Cross (United States)
1905 births
1992 deaths